The cruiser Bogatyr, launched 1901, was the lead ship of the  of four protected cruisers built between 1898 and 1907 for the Imperial Russian Navy.

Background
Although Askold was the fastest cruiser in the Russian fleet at the time of its commissioning, Bogatyr was selected for further development into a new class of ships.

Operational history
Bogatyr was laid down at the AG Vulcan Stettin shipyards in Stettin, Germany on 22 December 1899, launched on 30 January 1901 and commissioned on 20 August 1902. She initially entered service with the Russian Baltic Fleet.

During the Russo-Japanese War

At the start of the Russo-Japanese War of 1904–1905, Bogatyr was stationed at Vladivostok with the Russian Pacific Fleet's cruiser squadron under the overall command of Rear Admiral Karl Jessen. This squadron operated in the Sea of Japan and in waters near the Japanese home islands for commerce raiding and reconnaissance. During the first months of the war, the squadron made a number of sorties against Japanese shipping, but only one was reasonably successful when the merchant vessel Hitachi Maru, carrying eighteen  siege howitzers and over 1000 troops intended for the siege of Port Arthur, was sunk in June 1904. In response, the Imperial Japanese Navy assigned Vice Admiral Kamimura Hikonojō with a squadron of eight cruisers to pursue and destroy the Russian squadron.

However, on 15 May 1904, Bogatyr struck a rock in Amur Bay, and was so badly damaged that she could not be adequately repaired for the remainder of the war, and largely remained docked at Vladivostok.

After the end of the war, Bogatyr was repaired, and reassigned to the Russian Baltic Fleet. Bogatyr was deployed in the Mediterranean when a large earthquake struck Sicily on 28 December 1908. Some crewmen were killed by aftershocks while attempting to rescue people from the rubble. In 1912, Bogatyr underwent a complete refit and modernization program at Kronstadt.

World War I service
At the start of World War I, Bogatyr was part of the Russian 1st Cruiser Brigade in the Baltic Sea. The German crew scuttled their ship to avoid capture, but the German captain, Lieutenant-Commander Habenicht was captured by the Russians, together with the German code book. For the remainder of the year and early into 1915, Bogatyr covered minelaying operations in the Baltic, as well as laying mines herself.

On 2 July 1915, Bogatyr participated in the Battle of Åland Islands during which she drove the German light cruiser  onto the beach. In late 1915, she was refit and repaired in Kronstadt, and her main armament was upgraded to 130 mm/55 B7 Pattern 1913 guns. Through 1916, she mostly operated in the Baltic, off the coasts of Finland and Sweden, to interdict German convoys.

Following the November Revolution, the crew of Bogatyr declared for the Bolshevik cause, and the ship joined the Red Navy. After the armistice with Germany in December 1917, Bogatyr was demobilized at Helsinki. The Treaty of Brest-Litovsk required the Soviets to evacuate their base at Helsinki in March 1918 or have them interned by newly independent Finland even though the Gulf of Finland was still frozen over. Bogatyr sailed to Kronstadt in what became known as the 'Ice Voyage', and was placed into reserve shortly after her arrival.

In 1922, as with many ships of the former Imperial Russian Navy, Bogatyr was scrapped in Germany.

References

Sources

External links

 Article in Russian language
 Article in English with extensive photographs

Bogatyr-class cruisers
Russo-Japanese War cruisers of Russia
World War I cruisers of Russia
Naval ships of Russia
1901 ships
Maritime incidents in 1904
Shipwrecks of Russia